Vorona may refer to:

 Vorona, monotypic genus of prehistoric birds
 Vorona (album), album by Russian singer Linda
 Vorona, Botoșani, a commune in Botoșani County, Romania
 Vorona (Siret), a tributary of the river Siret in Botoșani County, Romania
 Vorona (Khopyor), a tributary of the river Khopyor in southern Russia
 Vorona (Bystrytsia), a tributary of the river Bystrytsia in Ivano-Frankivsk Oblast, Ukraine
 Vorona (surname)

See also
 Corona (disambiguation)